"Destiny of X" is a 2022 relaunch of the X-Men line of comic books published by Marvel Comics. It is the sequel to "Reign of X" following the end of the dual miniseries X Lives of Wolverine and X Deaths of Wolverine, and the first phase of the Krakoan era of X-Men following the departure of Jonathan Hickman during "Reign of X". A sequel, "Fall of X" is coming in the summer of 2023.

Titles

Prelude series

Ongoing series

Limited series

One-shots

Release order

 X Lives of Wolverine #1
 Marauders Annual #1
 X Deaths of Wolverine #1
 Sabretooth #1
 X Lives of Wolverine #2
 X Deaths of Wolverine #2
 X Lives of Wolverine #3
 X Deaths of Wolverine #3
 Sabretooth #2
 X Lives of Wolverine #4
 X Deaths of Wolverine #4
 X Lives of Wolverine #5
 X Deaths of Wolverine #5
 Immortal X-Men #1
 Marauders #1
 X-Force #27
 X-Force Annual #1
 X-Men Red #1
 X-Men #10
 Wolverine #20
 Knights of X #1
 Sabretooth #3
 Giant-Size X-Men: Thunderbird #1
 Marauders #2
 FCBD Avengers/X-Men #1
 X-Men #11
 Immortal X-Men #2
 New Mutants #25
 Wolverine #21
 X-Force #28
 X-Men Red #2
 Legion of X #1
 Knights of X #2
 Legion of X #2
 Marauders #3
 Wolverine #22
 X-Men Red #3
 Immortal X-Men #3
 Knights of X #3
 New Mutants #26
 X-Men #12
 Sabretooth #4
 X-Force #29
 X-Men Red #4
 Legion of X #3
 Sabretooth #5
 X-Men: Hellfire Gala #1
 Immortal X-Men #4
 Marauders #4
 New Mutants #27
 Wolverine #23
 Knights of X #4
 Immortal X-Men #5
 Legion of X #4
 X-Men Red #5
 New Mutants #28
 X-Force #30
 X-Men #13
 Marauders #5
 Knights of X #5
 X-Force #31
 X-Men #14
 Immortal X-Men #6
 Marauders #6
 New Mutants #29
 Wolverine #24
 X-Men Red #6
 Legion of X #5
 New Mutants #30
 X-Terminators #1
 X-Men #15
 A.X.E.: X-Men #1
 Marauders #7
 X-Men Red #7
 Immortal X-Men #7
 Legion of X #6
 Wolverine #25
 X-Force #32
 X-Force #33
 X-Men #16
 New Mutants #31
 Wolverine #26
 X-Terminators #2
 Deadpool #1
 X-Men Red #8
 Legion of X #7
 Marauders #8
 Sabretooth & the Exiles #1
 Wolverine #27
 Immortal X-Men #8
 X-Force #34
 X-Men #17
 X-Terminators #3
 Immortal X-Men #9
 Marauders #9
 New Mutants #32
 X-Force #35
 X-Men Red #9
 Dark Web: X-Men #1
 Deadpool #2
 Legion of X #8
 Sabretooth & the Exiles #2
 Wolverine #28
 X-Men Annual #1
 Dark Web: X-Men #2
 New Mutants #33
 X-Terminators #4
 Marauders #10
 X-Force #36
 X-Men Red #10
 Legion of X #9
 Wolverine #29
 X-Men #18
 Dark Web: X-Men #3
 Deadpool #3
 Immortal X-Men #10
 Sabretooth & the Exiles #3
 Sins of Sinister #1
 X-Terminators #5
 Legion of X #10
 X-Force #37
 Bishop: War College #1
 Storm & The Brotherhood Of Mutants #1
 Marauders #11
 Nightcrawlers #1
 Wolverine #30
 X-Men #19
 Betsy Braddock: Captain Britain #1
 Deadpool #4
 Immoral X-Men #1
 Sabretooth & the Exiles #4
 Rogue & Gambit #1
 X-Force #38
 New Mutants Lethal Legion #1
 Nightcrawlers #2
 X-Men #20
 Bishop: War College #2
 Immoral X-Men #2
 Wolverine #31
 Marauders #12
 Storm & The Brotherhood Of Mutants #2

Reading order

 X Lives of Wolverine #1
 X Deaths of Wolverine #1
 X Lives of Wolverine #2
 X Deaths of Wolverine #2
 X Lives of Wolverine #3
 X Deaths of Wolverine #3
 X Lives of Wolverine #4
 X Deaths of Wolverine #4
 X Lives of Wolverine #5
 X Deaths of Wolverine #5
 Sabretooth #1–5
 X-Force Annual #1
 X-Force #27–29
 Wolverine #20–23
 New Mutants #25–28
 X-Men #10
 Immortal X-Men #1–3
 Legion of X #1–5
 X-Men: Red #1
 Giant-Size X-Men: Thunderbird #1
 X-Men: Red #2–3
 Knights of X #1–5
 Marauders Annual #1
 Marauders #1–5
 New Mutants #29
 Free Comic Book Day 2022: Avengers/X-Men
 X-Men #11–12
 X-Men: Red #4
 X-Men: Hellfire Gala 2022 #1
 Immortal X-Men #4

Interlude (Avengers, X-Men, Eternals: Judgment Day)

 A.X.E.: Eve of Judgment #1
 A.X.E.: Judgment Day #1
 Immortal X-Men #5
 X-Men: Red #5
 A.X.E.: Judgment Day #2
 A.X.E.: Death to the Mutants #1
 X-Men #13
 A.X.E.: Judgment Day #3
 X-Men #14
 Immortal X-Men #6
 A.X.E.: Death to the Mutants #2
 Marauders #6
 X-Force #30
 X-Force #31
 Wolverine #24
 Fantastic Four #47
 Avengers #60
 Amazing Spider-Man #10
 X-Men Red #6
 A.X.E.: Judgement Day #4
 X-Men Red #7
 A.X.E.: Judgement Day #5
 A.X.E.: Avengers #1
 A.X.E.: Starfox #1
 A.X.E.: X-Men #1

Destiny of X resumes

 X-Men #15
 New Mutants #30
 X-Terminators #1
 Marauders #7

Related material

Collected editions 
Currently only available in French.

Notes

References

X-Men titles